Tamara is a 2016 French teen comedy film directed by Alexandre Castagnetti.

A sequel, Tamara Vol. 2, was released in 2018.

Cast

 Héloïse Martin as Tamara
 Rayane Bensetti as Diego
 Sylvie Testud as Amandine
 Cyril Gueï as Chico
 Oulaya Amamra as Jelilah
 Blanche Gardin as Valérie
 Bruno Salomone as Philippe-André Trémolo
 Jimmy Labeeu as Wagner
 Ina Castagnetti as Yoli
 Lou Gala as Anaïs
 Laure Nicodème as Joy
 Mélissa Bryon as Fatou
 Clara Choï as Luan
 Zack Groyne as Zak
 Lamine Cissokho as Babacar
 Martin Jurdant as Steve
 Yasser Jaafari as José
 François Rollin as The French teacher
 Sandra Zidani as The SVT teacher
 Marie-Ève Perron as The sports teacher
 Anne-Pascale Clairembourg friend of Amandine
 Dominique Rongvaux as Marc
 Elliot Goldberg as Esteban
 Vincent Santamaria as Greg

Production
Héloïse Martin was cast as Tamara, and played the part at age 20, having to gain weight for the film.

References

External links
 

2016 films
2016 comedy films
2010s high school films
2010s teen comedy films
Belgian teen comedy films
Body image in popular culture
Films based on Belgian comics
Films set in France
Films shot in France
French high school films
2010s French-language films
French teen comedy films
Live-action films based on comics
French-language Belgian films
2010s French films